Lakshmi School was founded in June 2000 with an initial intake of 159 students. , the student numbers are in excess of 2100. It is situated Sivagangai Road in the Madurai district of Tamil Nadu, India.

Introduction
The School follows the ICSE Syllabus till standard X and follows ISC Syllabus for standard XII.

Lakshmi Vidya Sangham

It is governed by a council called the Lakshmi Vidya Sangham constituted by the family of the founder of the TVS Group, T. V. Sundaram Iyengar. Lakshmi School was a "dream child of LVS".
There is a school parents' association, formed in 2011.

Affiliation

The school is affiliated to the Council for the Indian School Certificate Examinations (CISCE), New Delhi. The School is a recognized Examination Centre for ICSE and ISC examinations.

See also
 List of colleges and institutes in Madurai district

References

External links 

Primary schools in Tamil Nadu
High schools and secondary schools in Tamil Nadu
Schools in Madurai
Educational institutions established in 2000
2000 establishments in Tamil Nadu